Fordor may refer to
 A four-door automobile (as opposed to a "Tudor" two-door) in particular
 Four-door sedan
 Four-door coupé
 Full-size Ford, some models have "Fordor" in their name
 Ford C11ADF, army version called "Fordor" in Commonwealth countries
 In Bored of the Rings, the parody of Mordor

See also
 Fodor (disambiguation)